Brian J. Terwilliger (born ) is an American film director and producer known for his two films, One Six Right and Living in the Age of Airplanes, both of which are produced under his independent company Terwilliger Productions, based in Los Angeles.

Filmography
Living in the Age of Airplanes
One Six Right
Big Fish
The Core
Sordid Lives

References

Living people
1976 births